Donatas Motiejūnas (born September 20, 1990) is a Lithuanian professional basketball player for AS Monaco Basket of LNB Pro A and the EuroLeague. He was drafted 20th overall in the 2011 NBA draft by the Minnesota Timberwolves before going on to win the 2012 Polish Basketball League championship with Asseco Prokom Gdynia. After spending four seasons with the Houston Rockets from 2012 to 2016, Motiejūnas joined the New Orleans Pelicans in January 2017.

Professional career

Žalgiris Kaunas (2005–2008) 

In 2005, Motiejūnas began his career playing with Žalgiris Kaunas' junior team, Žalgiris-Arvydas Sabonis school, who play in the Lithuanian National Basketball League. In 2007–08, he made his debut for the senior team in a Baltic League game against the ASK Riga. He scored 15 points in 22 minutes.

Aisčiai Kaunas (2008–2009) 
In 2008, Motiejūnas signed with Aisčiai Kaunas for the 2008–09 season where he went on to average 19.9 points and 7.0 rebounds in 29.3 minutes per game, and he scored a season-high 29 points in a Lithuanian League game against Nevėžis on March 22, 2009.

Benetton Treviso (2009–2011) 
In August 2009, Motiejūnas signed a multi-year deal with Benetton Treviso of the Lega Basket Serie A. In 33 league games in 2009–10, he averaged 9.8 points and 5.2 rebounds per game.

In April 2010, Motiejūnas declared for the 2010 NBA draft, but later withdrew and returned to Benetton. He went on to win the 2011 EuroCup Rising Star award after helping Benetton reach the EuroCup 2010–11 Final Four, averaging 10.9 points and 5.6 rebounds per game.

Asseco Prokom (2011–2012) 
On June 23, 2011, Motiejūnas was selected with the 20th overall pick in the 2011 NBA draft by the Minnesota Timberwolves. The next day, his rights were traded, along with Jonny Flynn, to the Houston Rockets in exchange for Brad Miller and the draft rights to the 23rd overall pick, Nikola Mirotić. Due to the NBA lockout, Motiejūnas returned to Europe.

On September 22, 2011, Benetton loaned Motiejūnas to Asseco Prokom of Poland for the 2011–12 season. On December 7, 2011, he recorded a career-high 21 rebounds (18 defensive) against Union Olimpija, the most defensive rebounds in a EuroLeague game since the 2000–01 season. He also helped lead Asseco Prokom to a ninth consecutive PLK title in 2012. During the seventh and final game of the PLK Finals, he recorded 23 points and 11 rebounds.

Houston Rockets (2012–2016)

2012–13 season 

On July 6, 2012, Motiejūnas signed a four-year, rookie scale contract with the Houston Rockets and joined them for the 2012 NBA Summer League. In his summer league debut, he recorded 25 points, 9 rebounds, 2 assists, 2 steals and 1 block. After the game, he quoted a famous Lithuanian idiom describing his debut: "Jeigu bijai vilko – neik į mišką" (English: If you're scared of wolves, don't go into the woods). Overall, he averaged 16.3 points and 7.8 rebounds in four games.

On November 14, 2012, Motiejūnas was assigned to Rio Grande Valley Vipers of the NBA Development League. In his D-League debut on November 23, he recorded 31 points, 8 rebounds, 3 assists and 1 steals. Two days later, he was recalled by the Rockets. He was later reassigned two more times throughout the season and in seven D-League games, he averaged 20.3 points, 9.7 rebounds and 3.0 assists per game. In 44 games for the Rockets, he averaged 5.7 points and 2.1 rebounds per game.

2013–14 season 
On October 30, 2013, the Rockets exercised their third-year team option on Motiejūnas' rookie scale contract, extending the contract through the 2014–15 season. As a result of a disappointing start to the 2013–14 season with little playing time, Motiejūnas said: “When you give everything you got, you want to get something back and we are not getting for a long time. It’s really not easy to just sit and watch when others are playing. I try to stay positive. I try to help the team. I try to be productive in practices. That’s all I can do. That’s all that is in my power and other things are not in my power so I can not be worried about those things.” He went on to play 62 games for the Rockets while averaging 5.5 points and 3.6 rebounds per game.

2014–15 season 
In August 2014, Motiejūnas came under fire for comments made about his Rocket teammates James Harden and Dwight Howard, describing their relationship as "Hi & bye. They even eat separately from the team. Usually in some fast food place." The comments came in an interview with Lithuanian media. It was later revealed that Motiejūnas was misquoted in his comments due to an incorrect translation by Lithuanian media from Lithuanian to English.

On October 30, 2014, the Rockets exercised their fourth-year team option on Motiejūnas' rookie scale contract, extending the contract through the 2015–16 season. With Dwight Howard out for a string of 11 games during November and December, and Terrence Jones out for the majority of the first half of the season, Motiejūnas began to dominate in shaping a career-best season as he averaged 14.3 points and 7.1 rebounds per game in Howard's 11-game absence. Then, even with Howard's return on December 13, Motiejūnas scored a then career-high 25 points on 11-of-19 shooting to help the Rockets defeat the Denver Nuggets, 108-96.

On January 30, 2015, Motiejūnas scored a career-high 26 points in a 93-87 win over the Boston Celtics. On March 27, he was ruled out for one to two weeks with lower back pain and tightness. However, the injury later ruled him out for the rest of the season and put his chances of playing for the Lithuanian national team in doubt.

In his third NBA season, Motiejūnas led the league in post-up field goal percentage (53.4%), with his biggest competitor being fellow Lithuanian Jonas Valančiūnas of the Toronto Raptors (51.3%). In recognition, Jonathan Feigen of the Houston Chronicle awarded Motiejūnas an "A" grade for his 2014–15 season performance.

2015–16 season 
On December 1, 2015, Motiejūnas was cleared to return to practice, having been out since March 2015 after requiring surgery to repair a herniated disk in his back. Four days later, he returned to the Rockets' line-up and made his season debut, earning a standing ovation when he entered the game for the first time during the first quarter of the team's 120–113 win over the Sacramento Kings. He had one rebound and took a charge in six minutes of play. He played in 14 straight games for the Rockets, including making one start, before more back pain forced him out again. He subsequently missed all of January's action, and on January 30, he was assigned to the Rio Grande Valley Vipers for the first time since 2013 to complete his rehab from the back injury. He later received two more assignments to the Vipers.

On February 18, 2016, Motiejūnas and Marcus Thornton were traded to the Detroit Pistons in a three-team trade involving the Rockets and the Philadelphia 76ers. However, four days later, the Pistons rescinded their trade following a failed physical by Motiejūnas. On February 27, Motiejūnas returned to the Rockets' line-up and played for the first time since December 31. The Rockets finished the regular season as the eighth seed in the Western Conference with a 41–41 record. In the first round of the playoffs, the Rockets faced the first-seeded Golden State Warriors, and in a Game 3 win on April 21, Motiejūnas recorded 14 points and 13 rebounds for his first career double-double in the postseason.

New Orleans Pelicans (2017) 
After the 2015–16 season, Motiejūnas became a restricted free agent. On December 2, 2016, following a prolonged contract dispute with the Rockets which lasted into the first month of the 2016–17 season, he received a four-year, $37 million offer sheet from the Brooklyn Nets, which the Rockets matched three days later. A day after the Rockets matched his four-year offer sheet to retain him, Motiejūnas did not show up for his scheduled physical exam with the team. Motiejūnas' camp made the decision to not report to the Rockets because of a difference of nearly $6 million from the offer sheet he signed with the Nets; the Rockets only had to match the principle terms of the offer sheet, which came to $31 million. As a result, on December 9, the two sides negotiated a new four-year, partially guaranteed deal worth between $35 million and $37 million with bonus clauses. While they appeared to have a new deal in place, Motiejūnas was sent home before the team's game on December 10 after taking a physical, and five days later, the Rockets renounced the four-year deal and their rights to Motiejūnas, allowing him to become an unrestricted free agent.

On January 3, 2017, Motiejūnas signed with the New Orleans Pelicans. He made his debut for the Pelicans four days later, recording 11 points and five rebounds in 20 minutes off the bench in a 117–108 loss to the Boston Celtics. An unexpected trade during the All-Star break for DeMarcus Cousins led to a diminishing role for Motiejūnas. He initially appeared in 21 consecutive games after signing with New Orleans, but from February 25 through April 4, he logged 11 DNPs out of a 20-game span.

Shandong Golden Stars (2017–2019) 
On August 9, 2017, Motiejūnas signed a one-year, $2.2 million contract with the Shandong Golden Stars of the Chinese Basketball Association. It was reported that he was the highest paid foreigner of the whole league. On February 1, 2018, Motiejūnas recorded a triple double leading his team to an important 127–103 victory versus the Jiangsu Dragons by scoring 29 points, grabbing 15 rebounds and dishing out 10 assists. On March 13, 2018, Motiejūnas began the 2018 CBA Playoffs with 24 points, 7 rebounds and a victory versus the Jiangsu Dragons 104–100. His team defeated Jiangsu Dragons 3–0 in the first round after their third 127–104 victory during which Motiejūnas scored 29 points and grabbed 13 rebounds. In the semi-final, they faced Zhejiang Lions club, which offered a much higher competition. His team tied the series 2–2 after Motiejūnas solid contribution of 35 points (a career-high in China) and 14 rebounds versus his direct opponent Ioannis Bourousis. Despite his yet another astonishing performance of 31 points, 13 rebounds, 2 blocks and one assist, his team was eliminated in the series 3–4 after losing a decisive game 95–105.

On November 8, 2018, Motiejūnas achieved his career rebounds record by grabbing 25 rebounds and scoring 24 points that led his team to a 100–82 victory versus the Jiangsu Dragons. Less than a week later, on November 13, 2018, he improved his rebounds record once again by scoring 32 points and grabbing 32 rebounds, his team defeated the Shanghai Sharks 99–96.

On March 3, 2019, Motiejūnas scored a career high 43 points, grabbed 17 rebounds, dished out 6 assists and led his team to a 122–83 victory. Despite a terrific 2018–19 CBA regular season, during which he averaged 27.3 points, 14 rebounds, 4.2 assists and 1.8 steals, his team was eliminated in the first round of the 2019 CBA Playoffs, after losing 113–105 to the Jiangsu Dragons on March 20, 2019.

San Antonio Spurs (2019) 
On April 4, 2019, Motiejūnas signed with the San Antonio Spurs. He declined to sign a new contract with the Spurs because the Shanghai Sharks of the CBA offered a much more valuable deal.

Shanghai Sharks (2019–2020) 
On August 27, 2019, Motiejūnas signed a $6 million contract with the Shanghai Sharks (about $1 million per month). On October 1, 2019, he powerfully debuted his new team during a preseason game versus the Houston Rockets with 27 points, 11 rebounds, 3 steals and assists, however his team was crushed 71–140. On June 9, 2020, it was reported that Motiejūnas had parted ways with the Shanghai Sharks. In 28 games with the team, he averaged 22.8 points, a league-leading 15.1 rebounds, 3.5 assists, 1.8 steals and 0.5 blocks per game in 36.7 minutes of average playing time.

Xinjiang Flying Tigers (2020–2021) 
On September 17, 2020, Motiejūnas signed in China with the Xinjiang Flying Tigers.

AS Monaco (2021–present) 
On August 18, 2021, Motiejūnas signed with AS Monaco Basket.

National team career
Motiejūnas was a part of the Lithuanian Under-16, Under-18 and Under-20 junior national teams. With Lithuania's junior national teams, he played at the 2006 FIBA Europe Under-16 Championship, both the 2007 FIBA Europe Under-18 Championship and the 2008 FIBA Europe Under-18 Championship, the 2009 FIBA Under-19 World Championship, and the 2009 FIBA Europe Under-20 Championship.

Motiejūnas led Lithuania's junior national team to the silver medal at the 2008 FIBA Europe Under-18 Championship. Despite losing to Greece's junior national team in the gold medal game, he was named the MVP of the tournament, after averaging 18.2 points, 10.2 rebounds and 1.8 blocks per game. At the 2008 FIBA Europe Under-20 Championship, he averaged 11.2 points and 5.4 rebounds per game.

In 2013, Motiejūnas won a silver medal with Lithuania's national team at the FIBA EuroBasket tournament and went on to compete for the national team at the 2014 FIBA Basketball World Cup, where he averaged 7.4 points and 4.0 rebounds in nine games.

In June 2015, Motiejūnas ruled himself out of the 2015 FIBA EuroBasket to continue recovering from a back injury he sustained while playing for the Houston Rockets.

Personal life
Motiejūnas has a large tattoo on his chest of an eagle clutching a basketball. He explained, "I really like the attitudes of eagles. They never give up. When they grab a fish or something else, they never let it go." Motiejūnas is a fan of FC Bayern Munich and Germany national football team.

Career statistics

EuroLeague

|-
| style="text-align:left;"|2007–08
| style="text-align:left;"|Žalgiris Kaunas
| 3 || 0 || 7.2 || .200 || .000 || 1.000 || 2.7 || .0 || .0 || .0 || 1.3 || 1.3
|-
| style="text-align:left;"|2011–12
| style="text-align:left;"|Asseco Prokom
| 10 || 10 || 31.3 || .436 || .304 || .455  || 7.9 || .9 || .6 || .8 || 12.5 || 13.7
|-
| style="text-align:left;"|2021–22
| style="text-align:left;"|AS Monaco
| 38 || 34 || 19.5 || .572 || .327 || .447  || 4.6 || .7 || .5 || .3 || 9.7 || 10.8
|- class="sortbottom"
| style="text-align:center;" colspan="2"|Career
| 51 || 44 || 20.8 || .529 || .311 || .458 || 5.1 || .7 || .5 || .4 || 9.8 || 10.8

NBA

Regular season

|-
| style="text-align:left;"|
| style="text-align:left;"|Houston
| 44 || 14 || 12.2 || .455 || .289 || .627 || 2.1 || .7 || .2 || .2 || 5.7
|-
| style="text-align:left;"|
| style="text-align:left;"|Houston
| 62 || 3 || 15.4 || .443 || .250 || .604 || 3.6 || .5 || .3 || .3 || 5.5
|-
| style="text-align:left;"|
| style="text-align:left;"|Houston
| 71 || 62 || 28.7 || .504 || .368 || .602 || 5.9 || 1.8 || .8 || .5 || 12.0
|-
| style="text-align:left;"|
| style="text-align:left;"|Houston
| 37 || 22 || 14.8 || .439 || .281 || .642 || 2.9 || 1.1 || .5 || .1 || 6.2
|-
| style="text-align:left;"|
| style="text-align:left;"|New Orleans
| 34 || 0 || 14.1 || .413 || .234 || .510 || 3.0 || 1.0 || .5 || .3 || 4.4
|-
| style="text-align:left;"|
| style="text-align:left;"|San Antonio
| 3 || 0 || 4.3 || .500 ||  || .000 || 1.0 || .3 || .0 || .3 || 2.0
|- class="sortbottom"
| style="text-align:center;" colspan="2"|Career
| 251 || 101 || 18.2 || .469 || .300 || .597 || 3.8 || 1.1 || .5 || .3 || 7.3

Playoffs

|-
| style="text-align:left;"|2013
| style="text-align:left;"|Houston
| 1 || 0 || 5.0 || 1.000 ||  || 1.000 || 1.0 || .0 || .0 || .0 || 5.0
|-
| style="text-align:left;"|2016
| style="text-align:left;"|Houston
| 5 || 4 || 19.6 || .432 || .444 || .471 || 5.2 || 1.0 || .8 || .4 || 8.8
|-
| style="text-align:left;"|2019
| style="text-align:left;"|San Antonio
| 5 || 0 || 3.8 || .600 || .000 || .500 || 1.4 || .4 || .0 || .0 || 2.6
|- class="sortbottom"
| style="text-align:center;" colspan="2"|Career
| 11 || 4 || 11.1 || .490 || .400 || .500 || 3.1 || .6 || .4 || .2 || 5.6

References

External links

 Donatas Motiejūnas at euroleague.net
 Donatas Motiejūnas at legabasket.it

1990 births
Living people
2014 FIBA Basketball World Cup players
AS Monaco Basket players
Asseco Gdynia players
Basketball players from Kaunas
BC Žalgiris players
Centers (basketball)
Houston Rockets players
Lega Basket Serie A players
Lithuanian expatriate basketball people in China
Lithuanian expatriate basketball people in Italy
Lithuanian expatriate basketball people in Poland
Lithuanian expatriate basketball people in the United States
LSU-Atletas basketball players
Minnesota Timberwolves draft picks
National Basketball Association players from Lithuania
New Orleans Pelicans players
Pallacanestro Treviso players
Power forwards (basketball)
Rio Grande Valley Vipers players
San Antonio Spurs players
Shandong Hi-Speed Kirin players
Shanghai Sharks players